Victor Jean Léonard Vreuls (Verviers, 4 February 1876 – Saint-Josse-ten-Noode, 26 or 27 July 1944) was a classical Belgian composer, violinist and conductor.

Selected works 
 Stage
 Olivier le Simple, Opera in 3 acts (1909–1911); premiered 1922 in Brussels
 Un songe d'une nuit d'été (A Midsummer Night's Dream), Opera in 3 acts after the play by Shakespeare (1923–1924); premiered 1925 in Brussels
 Le loup-garou (The Werewolf), Légende chorégraphique (ballet) in 1 act (1935); premiered 1937 in Ghent

Orchestral
 Cortège héroïque (1894)
 Symphony in E major for violin and orchestra (1899)
 Poème in E major for cello and orchestra, Op. 3 (1900); version for cello (or viola) and piano (1904)
 Jour de fête, Symphonic Poem (1904)
 Werther (1907); after the novel The Sorrows of Young Werther by Goethe
 Adagio for string orchestra
 Morceau de Concert for trumpet and orchestra (or piano) (1917)
 Élégie for flute and chamber orchestra (or piano) (1917)
 Fantaisie for French horn and orchestra (or piano) (1918)
 Romance for violin and chamber orchestra (1924)
 Caprice for violin and chamber orchestra (1924)
 Deuxième Poème (Poem No. 2) for cello and orchestra (or piano) (1930)
 Suite de danses (1939)
 Ouverture pour un drame (1940)
 Rhapsodie modèrne
 Evocation for chamber orchestra

Chamber music
 Piano Quartet (1894)
 Piano Trio in D minor, Op. 1 (1896)
 Sonata No. 1 in B major for violin and piano (1899)
 String Quartet in F major (1903)
 Sonata No. 2 in G major for violin and piano (1919)
 Sonata in D minor for cello and piano (1922)

Piano
 En Ardenne (published 1918)
 Prélude élégiaque (published 1921)
 Caprice in E major (published 1921)

Vocal
 Tryptique for voice and orchestra (published 1903); poem by Paul Verlaine
 3 Mélodies for voice and piano (published 1912)
     L'automne sur la Fagne (1907); poem by Jean Dominique
     Le soir (1910); poem by René Lyr
     J'ai reposé mon âme! (My soul found peace!) (1903); poem by Stuart Merrill
 La gerbe ardennaise for voice and piano (published 1920); words by Adolphe-Marie Hardy
     Vesprées
     Coin perdu
     Dans les bois
     L'heure du rêve
 La Guirlande des dunes, 5 Poèmes de Émile Verhaeren for voice and piano (published 1920)
     Temps gris
     Femme des dunes
     Midi
     Les Gas de la mer
     Bruges au loin
 Pour toi for voice and piano (published 1921); poem by Tina Louant
 Chanson for voice and piano (Si tu laissais parler mon rêve il parlerait si bas); poem by Jules Delacre
 Renouveau for voice and orchestra; poem by René Lyr
 Cantata for chorus and orchestra

Honours 
 1932 : Commander in the Order of Leopold.

References

Bibliography

External links

1876 births
1944 deaths
20th-century classical composers
Belgian classical composers
Belgian male classical composers
Belgian conductors (music)
Belgian classical violinists
Members of the Royal Academy of Belgium
People from Verviers
20th-century Belgian male musicians